Noctropolis is a 1994 MS-DOS third-person adventure game by Flashpoint Productions and published by Electronic Arts. In the game, the player assumes the role of the character Peter Grey, a lonely bookstore owner who winds up in the world of his favorite comic book. Grey soon discovers that he is destined to assume the role of his former comic book hero.

Gameplay
This style of game play is mostly third-person point-and-click, with some cut scenes. The player not only has to locate items but carefully choose dialog to gather information to help them progress through the game.

Characters in the game were digitized from analog footage, allowing for real life characters to be placed in 2D digital environments.

Reception

Charles Ardai of Computer Gaming World, while approving of the game's visual style and detailed art, criticized that the game has a simplistic interface and uses juvenile shock value in the form of gratuitous violence and sexual content in order to distract from the lack of substance to the story. He added, "It's also highly derivative, both of actual comic books and of other computer games." A reviewer for Next Generation highly praised the game's story, abstract and challenging puzzles, comic-book style backgrounds, digitized character animation, soundtrack, and dark atmosphere. Though he remarked that some of the dialogue is silly for a Mature-rated game, and that many of the puzzles require illogical leaps of intuition, he concluded that "Those not requiring the utmost in realism will find this to be one of the best graphic adventures of the season."

Legacy
In 2015 Night Dive Studios acquired the rights of the game and was able to recover the source code from the original developer. The game's assembly code was ported with the help of the original developer to C++ to port the game to modern platforms. On 3 September 2015, the Enhanced Edition was released on Steam, on 21 January 2016 followed a release on the DRM-free distributor GOG.com. The remastered game features full compatibility with contemporary computers, a remastered soundtrack, improved keyboard/mouse support with rebindable keys/buttons and several bug fixes, and removed dead-end situations that would render the game unwinnable. On 27 October 2017, Linux and macOS versions of the Enhanced Edition were released.

Gamers who pirated a copy of this version of Noctropolis will see their character imprisoned on the game over screen instead of the standard animations.

References

External links

Noctropolis at GameFAQs

1994 video games
Adventure games
DOS games
Electronic Arts games
Full motion video based games
Horror video games
Linux games
MacOS games
Point-and-click adventure games
Single-player video games
Video games about vampires
Video games with digitized sprites
Weird fiction video games
Windows games
Works about comics
Video games developed in the United States